Malangaon Dam is an earthfill dam on the Kan River near Sakri, Dhule district, in the state of Maharashtra in India. It is used for irrigation.

Specifications

See also
 Dams in Maharashtra
 List of reservoirs and dams in India

References

Dams in Dhule district
Dams completed in 1970
1970 establishments in Maharashtra